The Office français d'information (OFI) was the press agency controlled by the Vichy regime during the German occupation.

It was created on 10 December 1940 after the nationalization by the Vichy regime of the information branch of Havas.

During the Paris uprising of August 20, 1944, resistance journalists, including , seized the OFI offices and proclaimed the creation of Agence France-Presse, which became the agency France-Presse on September 30, 1944.

See also
 Vichy France
 Havas
 Agence France-Presse

References

Bibliography 
 
 

Vichy France